Athletics competitions at the 1986 Central American Games were held at the Estadio Nacional Mateo Flores in Guatemala City, Guatemala, in January 1986.

A total of 40 events were contested, 24 by men and 16 by women.

Medal summary

Gold medal winners and their results were published.  A complete list of medal winners can be found on the MásGoles webpage
(click on "JUEGOS CENTROAMERICANOS" in the low right corner).  Gold medalists were also published in other sources.

All results are marked as "affected by altitude" (A), because 
Guatemala City is located at 1,592 m above sea level.

Men

Women

Medal table (unofficial)

References

Athletics at the Central American Games
International athletics competitions hosted by Guatemala
Central American Games
1986 in Guatemalan sport